The Holy Family with Saints Anne and Catherine of Alexandria is a 1648 painting by the Spanish artist Jusepe de Ribera owned by the Metropolitan Museum of Art in New York. The museum acquired The Holy Family with Saints Anne and Catherine of Alexandria in 1934 from the Earl of Harewood.

The painting appears in the television show The Sopranos during the episode "Amor Fou".

References

1648 paintings
Paintings by Jusepe de Ribera
Paintings in the collection of the Metropolitan Museum of Art